Weelsby Woods is a large public park in Grimsby, North East Lincolnshire.  With mature trees, woodland, and large grassy areas which are used for recreation.

Donated in 1950 to the Borough of Grimsby by the Fred Parks Esq. the land was once the grounds of Weelsby Villa.  Victorian maps of the area display a Manor House to one side of the park, and to the other side the Villa Plantation, a Pheasantry and a large pond.

During the First World War the woods were a training ground for locally recruited soldiers.

During the Second World War, the Woods were used as a camp for Italian prisoners of war, prisoners were held in a series of single floor buildings. Two of which serviced the woods in the form of toilets and a cafe, they remained - in a derelict and disused state until July 2006, when they were replaced to make way for a children's play area. Foundations of the former buildings can still be made out on the main hilltop due to a difference in grass growth.

The park has a wide variety of mature trees and associated wildlife.  Some of the untended areas of the parkland have an abundance of birds,  foxes, and small mammals.

For recreational use the woods are popular with dog walkers, sports teams, joggers, and families with children.

Weelsby Woods is famous for the two large lion statues that stand, one on either side, of the main entrance. They are over 100 years old, and were temporarily removed for cleaning and refurbishment in 2006.

Parks and open spaces in Lincolnshire